Sudhir Kumar Ghosal is an Indian politician. He was elected to the Lok Sabha, lower house of the Parliament of India from Midnapore, West Bengal as a member of the Janata Party.

References

External links
Official Biographical Sketch in Lok Sabha Website

Janata Party politicians
India MPs 1977–1979
Lok Sabha members from West Bengal
1920 births
Year of death missing